Custody is a 2007 Lifetime television movie starring Rob Morrow, James Denton, and Kay Panabaker about a widower's fight for custody of the daughter he raised and legally adopted, when her birth father who abandoned her returns. Aired on September 8, 2007. It was filmed in and around Ottawa on locations such as the University of Ottawa, Rideau Canal, and Le Chateau Montebello. It is based on the book Figures of Echo by Mary S. Herczog.

Cast
Rob Morrow as David Gordon
Kay Panabaker as Amanda Gordon
James Denton as John Sullivan
Robin Brûlé as Megan
Sergio Di Zio as Eugene
Allana Harkin as Barbara
Gord Rand as Peyton
Brenda Bazinet
Pierre Brault
Dominique Bisson as Susan
France Veins
Bella Szpala as Young Amanda

Reception
Variety said, "While “Custody” isn’t necessarily bad, then, it’s so inconsequential as to fail the test inherent in the story itself — namely, if somebody tried to take this movie away, it’s hard to imagine anybody petitioning to stop them."

References

External links

Hollywood Reporter

Films about families
Films directed by Nadia Tass
Films shot in Ottawa
Lifetime (TV network) films
2007 television films
2007 films
2000s English-language films